The 2022 Tel Aviv Open (also known as the 2022 Tel Aviv Watergen Open for sponsorship purposes) was a tennis tournament to be played on indoor hard courts. It was the inaugural edition of the Tel Aviv Open at the ATP Tour level since 1996, and  part of the ATP Tour 250 series of the 2022 ATP Tour. It was played at Expo Tel Aviv in Tel Aviv, Israel, from 26 September to 2 October 2022.

The event was primarily organized due to the cancellation of tournaments in China during the 2022 season because of the ongoing COVID-19 pandemic.

Champions

Singles 

  Novak Djokovic def.  Marin Čilić, 6–3, 6–4
 It was Djokovic's 3rd title of the year and the 89th of his career.

Doubles 

  Rohan Bopanna /  Matwé Middelkoop def.  Santiago González /  Andrés Molteni, 6–2, 6–4

Singles main-draw entrants

Seeds

1 Rankings are as of 19 September 2022.

Other entrants
The following players received wildcards into the main draw:
  Hamad Međedović
  Yshai Oliel
  Dominic Thiem

The following players received entry from the qualifying draw:
  Liam Broady 
  Marius Copil 
  Cem İlkel
  Edan Leshem 

The following player received entry as a lucky loser:
  Vasek Pospisil

Withdrawals
  Benjamin Bonzi → replaced by  Hugo Grenier
  Karen Khachanov → replaced by  J. J. Wolf
  Alex Molčan → replaced by  Tomás Martín Etcheverry
  Tommy Paul → replaced by  Constant Lestienne
  Albert Ramos Viñolas → replaced by  Vasek Pospisil

Doubles main-draw entrants

Seeds

1 Rankings are as of 19 September 2022.

Other entrants
The following pairs received wildcards into the doubles main draw:
  Daniel Cukierman /  Edan Leshem  
  Hamad Međedović /  Yshai Oliel

The following pair received entry as alternates:
  Marco Bortolotti /  Sergio Martos Gornés

Withdrawals
  Benjamin Bonzi /  Arthur Rinderknech → replaced by  Marco Bortolotti /  Sergio Martos Gornés
  Tomás Martín Etcheverry /  Albert Ramos Viñolas → replaced by  Novak Djokovic /  Jonathan Erlich

References

External links
Official website
Tournament page at ATPWorldTour.com

Tel Aviv Open
Tel Aviv Open
Tel Aviv Open
September 2022 events in Israel
October 2022 events in Israel
Tel Aviv Open
Tel Aviv Open